Muckle Skerry is the largest of the Pentland Skerries that lie off the north coast of Scotland. It is home to the Pentland Skerries Lighthouse.

It is the westernmost of the skerries. However the notoriously bad weather of the firth has historically rendered Muckle Skerry uninhabitable and as such it is more often thought of as a skerry.

Pentland Skerries Lighthouse
Pentland Skerries Lighthouse was constructed in 1794 by the Commissioners of the Northern Lights. The engineers were Thomas Smith and his stepson Robert Stevenson (this was the first light that Stevenson officially worked on).

See also

 List of lighthouses in Scotland
 List of Northern Lighthouse Board lighthouses

References

External links

 Pentland Skerries Northern Lighthouse Board 
 Northern Lighthouse Board

Uninhabited islands of Orkney
Skerries of Scotland